Ardell Leonard Wiegandt (born June 28, 1940) is a former Canadian football coach. He was the coach of the Calgary Stampeders from 1980 to 1981. He was also inducted into the North Dakota State Athletic Hall of Fame in 1977.

References

1940 births
Living people
American football linebackers
North Dakota State Bison football players
Birmingham Americans coaches
Buffalo Bills coaches
Calgary Stampeders coaches
Kansas Jayhawks football coaches
Montreal Alouettes coaches
Ottawa Rough Riders coaches
People from Nelson County, North Dakota
Coaches of American football from North Dakota
Players of American football from North Dakota